Operation Board Games is a federal fraud investigation initiated by United States Attorney Patrick Fitzgerald in December 2003, in order to investigate suspected fraud and extortion activity by Illinois Governor Rod Blagojevich. The investigation's name is a reference to two governing bodies in Illinois: one board controlling the Teacher's Pension System, and the second being the Health Facilities Planning Board.

History
In summer 2006, Fitzgerald indicated that he was investigating allegations of "endemic hiring fraud" in state agencies under Blagojevich's control as part of the federal Operation Board Games probe. The effort was characterized at that time as locating "a number of credible witnesses" but Blagojevich was not accused of any unlawful activities. The May 2007 indictment of Chicago attorney Edward Vrdolyak for his "alleged involvement in a kickback scheme concerning the sale of a Chicago Gold Coast neighborhood building was another piece of the "Operation Board Games" investigation.

A total of fifteen individuals have also been indicted in the course of the investigation. The thirteenth indictment, of William F. Cellini, Sr., which is seemingly the last one before Blagojevich and Harris, occurred in October 2008:

The focus of the investigation was on Blagojevich, which led to the Rod Blagojevich corruption charges. Blagojevich was convicted on 17 of 20 counts on June 27, 2011.

References

External links
 Businessman and Political Fundraiser Antoin Rezko Indicted in Two Fraud Cases, Including Scheme to Extort Millions of Dollars from Firms Seeking Teachers' Pension Fund Investments

2008 in American politics
Federal Bureau of Investigation operations
Political corruption investigations in the United States
Political scandals in Illinois
Rod Blagojevich
United States Department of Justice